Kevon Seymour (born November 30, 1993) is an American football cornerback that is a free agent. He played college football at USC.

College career
In four seasons at USC, Seymour had 126 tackles (4 for a loss), 19 deflections, one fumble recovery, and three interceptions with 24 starts. He played as a true freshman in 2012 as a backup cornerback and a special teams contributor. As a sophomore, his role increased as he was a starter in 12 games. In his senior season, he saw limited playing time due to injuries.

Professional career

Buffalo Bills
Seymour was drafted by the Buffalo Bills in the sixth round, 218th overall, in the 2016 NFL Draft. After an impressive preseason, he made the Bills final roster. He played in 15 games as a rookie with three starts recording 22 tackles and three passes defensed.

Carolina Panthers
On September 2, 2017, Seymour was traded to the Carolina Panthers for wide receiver Kaelin Clay.

On September 1, 2018, Seymour was placed on injured reserve.

On September 1, 2019, Seymour was released by the Panthers. After spending the 2019 season out of the NFL, he worked for a tire store in Charlotte, North Carolina.

Philadelphia Eagles
On December 2, 2020, Seymour was signed to the Philadelphia Eagles' practice squad. On December 12, 2020, Seymour was signed to the active roster. He was placed on injured reserve on December 26, 2020. He was waived from injured reserve on January 6, 2021, and signed a reserve/futures contract with the team two days later.

Seymour was waived on August 31, 2021.

Baltimore Ravens
On September 15, 2021, Seymour was signed to the Baltimore Ravens practice squad. On October 2, 2021, Seymour was promoted to the active roster then promoted back to the practice squad. On November 27, 2021, Seymour was promoted to the active roster. He was placed on the reserve/COVID-19 list by the Ravens on November 29, 2021. On December 8, 2021, Seymour was activated from reserve/COVID-19 list by the Ravens.

On January 17, 2022, Seymour signed a one-year contract extension with the Ravens. He was released on August 30, 2022 and signed to the practice squad the next day. He was promoted to the active roster on October 1.

NFL career statistics

References

External links
USC Trojans bio
Buffalo Bills bio

1993 births
Living people
African-American players of American football
Players of American football from Pasadena, California
American football cornerbacks
USC Trojans football players
Buffalo Bills players
Carolina Panthers players
Philadelphia Eagles players
Baltimore Ravens players
21st-century African-American sportspeople